Various kinds of clandestine media emerged under German occupation during World War II. By 1942, Nazi Germany occupied much of continental Europe. The widespread German occupation saw the fall of public media systems in France, Belgium, Poland, Norway, Czechoslovakia, Northern Greece, and the Netherlands. All press systems were put under the ultimate control of Joseph Goebbels, the German Minister of Propaganda.

Without control of the media, occupied populations began to create and publish their own uncensored newspapers, books and political pamphlets. The underground press played a "crucial role" in informing and motivating resistance across the continent and building solidarity. They also created an "intellectual battlefield" in which ideas like post-war reconstruction could be discussed. Underground forms of media allowed for information sharing among the oppressed, helping them build solidarity, strengthen morale and, in some cases, stage uprisings.

By country

Belgium

An important underground press emerged from the Belgian Resistance in German-occupied Belgium soon after the defeat in May 1940. Eight underground newspapers had appeared by October 1940 alone. Much of the resistance's press focused around producing newspapers in both French and Dutch languages as alternatives to censored or pro-collaborationist newspapers. At its peak, the clandestine newspaper La Libre Belgique, a title which had first appeared under German occupation in World War I, was relaying news within five to six days; faster than the BBC's French-language radio broadcasts, whose coverage lagged several months behind events. Copies of the underground newspapers were distributed anonymously, with some pushed into letterboxes or sent by post.

Since they were usually free, the costs of printing were financed by donations from sympathisers. The papers achieved considerable circulation, with  reaching a regular circulation of 40,000 by January 1942 and peaking at 70,000, while the Communist paper, reached 30,000. Dozens of different newspapers existed, often affiliated with different resistance groups or differentiated by political stance, ranging from nationalist, Communist, Liberal or even Feminist. The number of Belgians involved in the underground press is estimated at anywhere up to 40,000 people. In total, 567 separate titles are known from the period of occupation.

The resistance also printed humorous publications and material as propaganda. In November 1943, on the anniversary of the German surrender in the First World War, the  group published a spoof edition of the censored newspaper , satirizing the Axis propaganda and biased information permitted by the censors. The new newspaper was then distributed to newsstands across Brussels and deliberately mixed with ordinary official newspapers to be sold to the public. 50,000 copies of the spoof publication, dubbed the "Faux Soir" (literally, the "Fake Le Soir"), were sold.

In 2012, the Centre for Historical Research and Documentation on War and Contemporary Society (Cegesoma) launched a project to digitally archive all surviving Belgian clandestine publications from both World War I and II.

Channel Islands
The Channel Islands were occupied by Germany in June 1940 and were the only British territory invaded during the war. Although little active resistance occurred, a number of underground publications existed. The most notable was the Guernsey Underground News Sheet, or GUNS, on Guernsey. The newspaper, directed by Frank Falla and published between 1942 and 1944, reproduced material from BBC news bulletins. Its workers were denounced in February 1944 and deported to concentration camps.

Czechoslovakia
An underground press emerged rapidly in Czechoslovakia after the German annexation and invasion of 1938–39. One of the first was the newspaper  (To Fight) published by Josef Skalda in Prague. Although it achieved a circulation of 10,000, Skalda was arrested in November 1939 and the publication ceased. Later newspapers included the Voice of the People and National Liberation.

In 1941, during German occupation of Czechoslovakia, the Czech Resistance was in radio contact with the exiled Czech government in London. These radios were strategically airdropped by Allied forces, and by October 1941, all resistance radios had been discovered by the Gestapo. There were multiple airdrops in 1942 that led to new radio contact between January and June 1942. These secret radio stations were not only used with the sole purpose of communicating with London, but could also reach the Czech people. These secret radio stations would broadcast military intelligence and reports of both Nazi movements and Allied movements. These reports varied, some were true, some were false and served only to raise national morale. Many consider these clandestine radios to be a failure for their lack of reporting on the state of the Jewish population in Czechoslovakia, under Nazi rule.

The Czechoslovak resistance groups were also known to send anti-Nazi pamphlets into Germany, in hopes that anti-fascist Germans would rise up against the Nazi regime. They would hide the small books and other pieces of anti-Nazi literature in tea pouches, shampoo, plant seed packaging, and German tourist pamphlets etc. One of the better known pamphlets was inside the German tourism brochure  (Learn About Beautiful Germany) which included a map of the Nazi death camps.

Denmark
Following their invasion of Denmark in 1940, the Germans did not confiscate the population's radios, removing much of the need for underground media. Only with the 1941 banning of the Communist Party of Denmark did a significant underground press emerge, with the illegal continued publishing of the Communist Party's paper .  At its height,  reached a circulation of 130,000, and was the largest underground newspaper in Denmark throughout the German occupation. In respectively December 1941 and April 1942 the major bipartisan papers  and  followed. In all some 600 different underground papers were published in Denmark.

With the population having access to news from the United Kingdom and Sweden through radio, the underground press in Denmark focussed on opinion pieces until 1943, when relations between Danish authorities and the Germans deteriorated.

France

France was invaded and occupied after a disastrous military campaign in May–June 1940. Under the armistice agreement, the country was divided into two zones: an area in the northern half of the country (including Paris) under direct German military occupation and a "Free Zone" in the South ruled by the semi-independent Vichy regime under Marshal Philippe Pétain. Frustration and unrest in both parts led to the emergence of the French Resistance which, by 1942, had become a mass movement.

The first French underground newspapers emerged in opposition to German and Vichy control of French radio and newspapers. Few produced issues for both German and Vichy zones, though  was an early exception. In early newspaper issues, individuals often wrote under a number of pseudonyms in the same issue to convey the impression that a team of individuals was working on a newspaper. Initially underground newspapers represented a wide range of political opinions but, by 1944, had generally converged in support of Gaullist Free French in the United Kingdom.

These newspapers were anti-Nazi propaganda, but practiced propaganda themselves by misreporting events, and glorifying and enlarging Allied victories. The reporting in these newspapers was often subjective, as they aimed to capture and shape public opinion rather than accurately represent it. The extent to which underground newspapers actually affected French popular opinion under the occupation is disputed by historians.

A small number of underground presses were also active in printing illegal books and works of literature. Its publisher, became a successful commercial literary publisher in post-war France.

The National Library of France (BnF) began a project in 2012 to digitise surviving French underground newspapers. By 2015, 1,350 titles had been uploaded on its Gallica platform.

Greece
Greece was invaded by Italy in October 1940, but not occupied until after the German invasion in April 1941. Greece was  occupied and divided into German, Italian and Bulgarian zones and a Greek puppet government was created. Greek Resistance emerged rapidly. The left-leaning National Liberation Front (or EAM) published the country's first underground newspaper, Forward, in January 1942.

A group of former army officers, organized into the Army of Enslaved Victors began publishing a newspaper called Great Greece. The Panhellenic Union of Fighting Youths (or PEAN) published an alternative newspaper called Glory in both German-occupied Athens and the Bulgarian-occupied Macedonia. The pre-war newspaper The Radical, produced by the Communist Party of Greece, was produced as an underground publication. Other newspaper included Fighting Greece.

Luxembourg
Luxembourg was invaded by Nazi Germany in May 1940 and was conquered in less than a day. The German occupation authority considered Luxembourgers, although largely trilingual in French, German and Luxembourgish, to be a Germanic people and thus suitable for annexation into Germany itself by 1942.

The first underground newspaper,  (Our Homeland), was published by the LPL but soon ceased publication after its directors were arrested. It was printed in Belgium.  was restarted by the  late in the war.

Netherlands

Fearing that Dutch exposure to Allied radio programming would turn the Dutch against them, the Nazis called for the confiscation of all radio transmitters soon after the country was occupied in May 1940. By May 1943, they had confiscated nearly 80 percent of Dutch radios, amounting to just over one million sets. Allied radio broadcasts were so important to the Dutch people that many people began building crystal radios. Crystal radios were fairly easy to build and could be made quickly in large quantities. Their main advantage was that they required no batteries and could only be heard by those operating them but were very hard to control or tune. During the Dutch famine of 1944, many people smuggled crystal radios to farmers in exchange for fresh produce.

In 1943, Frans Goedhart was captured by Nazi officials and tried in a German court. To conceal his secret identity as Pieter 't Hoen, writers at  periodically published articles under his pseudonym. In August 1943, Goedhart was sentenced to death. He escaped three days before his execution, with the help of Dutch officials. Upon his escape, Goedhart returned to his position of editor at the newspaper . 's main objective was to raise national moral and organize the Dutch people against Nazi rule. After the Germans began their occupation, working on an illegal newspaper was punishable by immediate jail time, and in the latter years of the war, death. Altogether, as many as 1,200 separate newspaper titles were produced by the Dutch resistance during the war. Collectively, the underground press provided a space for free debate about political and religious issues, as well as for planning for after the liberation.

Norway

The first underground newspapers in occupied Norway were published by the nascent Norwegian resistance movement in the summer of 1940, soon after the conclusion of the Norwegian Campaign. The main purpose of the underground newspapers was to distribute news from BBC Radio, as well as messages and appeals from the Norwegian government in exile.

In October 1942, the German authorities in Norway made it a capital crime to read underground newspapers. Of the people involved in the underground press in Norway, 3,000 to 4,000 were arrested by the Germans, of whom 62 were executed and a further 150 died as a consequence of their captivity.

Poland

In addition to publication of news (from intercepted Western radio transmissions), there were hundreds of underground publications dedicated to politics, economics, education, and literature (for example,  (Art and Nation)). The highest recorded publication volume was an issue of  printed in 43,000 copies; the average volume of larger publication was 1,000–5,000 copies. The Polish underground also published booklets and leaflets from imaginary anti-Nazi German organizations aimed at spreading disinformation and lowering morale among the Germans. Books were also sometimes printed. Other items were also printed, such as patriotic posters or fake German administration posters, ordering the Germans to evacuate Poland or telling Poles to register household cats.

The two largest underground publishers were the Bureau of Information and Propaganda of Armia Krajowa and the Government Delegation for Poland.  (Secret Military Publishing House) of Jerzy Rutkowski (subordinated to the Armia Krajowa) was probably the largest underground publisher in the world. In addition to Polish titles, Armia Krajowa also printed false German newspapers designed to decrease morale of the occupying German forces (as part of Action N). The majority of Polish underground presses were located in occupied Warsaw; until the Warsaw Uprising in the summer of 1944 the Germans found over 16 underground printing presses (whose crews were usually executed or sent to concentration camps). The second largest center for Polish underground publishing was Kraków. There, writers and editors faced similar dangers: for example, almost the entire editorial staff of the underground satirical paper  (In [Your] Ear) was arrested, and its chief editors  executed in Kraków on 27 May 1944. ( was the longest published Polish underground paper devoted to satire; 20 issues were published starting in October 1943.) The underground press was supported by a large number of activists; in addition to the crews manning the printing presses, scores of underground couriers distributed the publications. According to some statistics, these couriers were among the underground members most frequently arrested by the Germans.

See also
Tarnschriften – disguised publications in Nazi Germany

References

Bibliography

Further reading

External links
Belgian War Press (online archive) at Cegesoma
Journaux clandestins de la résistance (online archive) at BnF Gallica
Verzetskranten at Delpher (Royal Library of the Netherlands)